Cyperus schinzii is a species of sedge that is native to the south west of Africa, where it has been found in Angola, Botswana, Namibia and South Africa.

The species was first formally described by the botanist Johann Otto Boeckeler in 1888.

See also 
 List of Cyperus species

References 

schinzii
Taxa named by Johann Otto Boeckeler
Plants described in 1888
Flora of South Africa
Flora of Angola
Flora of Botswana
Flora of Namibia